The 2017–18 SC Paderborn 07 season is the 33rd season in the football club's history. The season covers a period from 1 July 2017 to 30 June 2018.

Players

Squad information

Friendly matches

Competitions

3. Liga

League table

Results summary

Results by round

Matches

DFB-Pokal

Westphalian Cup

References

SC Paderborn 07 seasons
Paderborn